Vikas Dubey (December 26, 1964July 10, 2020) was a notorious Indian criminal, history-sheeter and a gangster-turned-politician from Kanpur,Uttar Pradesh particularly infamous for Bikaru case in July 2020. He was commonly known as "Vikas Pandit", naming himself after the titular character of the 1999 film Arjun Pandit. He was also alternatively referred to as "Pandit Ji".

Prosecutors began the first criminal case against him in the early 1990s, and by 2020, Dubey had over 60 criminal cases filed against him. He was connected to the murder of a minister of state, and in another incident, was the main accused in killing eight policemen during an attempted arrest. Uttar Pradesh Police declared him an absconder with a bounty of ₹5 lakhs on him, and he was arrested on July 9, 2020, in Ujjain. He was killed on July 10, 2020, in an encounter, after the police vehicle carrying him met with an accident. Media reports state that because of his political connections, Dubey had been acquitted for most of his murders, despite the presence of multiple witnesses at the scenes. Following his death, a judicial commission led by a retired Supreme Court judge, B. S. Chauhan, was initiated to probe Dubey's death and how he managed bail, among other things.

Early life
Dubey was born in a brahmin family in Bikroo village near Bilhaur in Kanpur Nagar district, Uttar Pradesh. From a young age, he formed a local gang and was responsible for criminal activities, including "land grabbing" and murder. He often targeted people for land grabbing as he perceived them to be easy targets. Dubey soon became one of the most wanted criminals in Kanpur. The first case lodged against him, in 1990, was for murder. Soon, he was associated as a close ally of Harikishan Srivastava, a local politician. Srivastava was then a part of the Bharatiya Janata Party (BJP) but joined the Bahujan Samaj Party (BSP) in the mid-1990s. Dubey also joined the BJP in 1995-96 and won elections at the district level, allegedly by employing muscle power. His wife, Richa Dubey also won elections of local bodies. Dubey was the primary accused in the 2001 killing of BJP leader Santosh Shukla, who was then a minister of state. He was arrested but was later discharged, allegedly due to his political influence.

July 2020 encounter
On July 3, 2020, during an attempt to arrest Dubey and his men, eight policemen were killed, including a deputy superintendent of police (DSP), while seven police personnel were left injured. Two gunmen, identified as a maternal uncle and another close relative of Dubey, were also killed in the gunfight. The autopsy report revealed that DSP Devendra Mishra had been beheaded and brutalized with an axe, while other policemen had multiple bullet wounds, which were fired from different weapons, suggesting an ambush. The police later recovered weapons, including an Ak-47 rifle and an INSAS rifle, among others. The inspector-general of Kanpur said that at least 60 men had ambushed the police team, who were 30 in number. Call records showed that Dubey was in contact with multiple police personnel, who leaked information to him. Following this, the Kanpur administration demolished his house with a bulldozer, and 25 police teams were then formed to arrest Dubey and his other associates.

Arrest and death
Dubey was arrested in 2017; when the government of Uttar Pradesh charged him under the Gangsters Act and Anti-Social Activities (Prevention) Act and charge-sheeted him in 2019. He challenged this at the High Court and secured an order of no coercive action against him.

He was apprehended again on July 9, 2020, near the Mahakaleshwar Jyotirlinga temple in Ujjain, Madhya Pradesh. He was reported to have shouted his name while being arrested, in fear of being killed like his accomplices. A petition was filed in the Supreme Court that same night which requested police protection for him and a thorough CBI investigation of his crimes.

On 10 July, the police vehicle carrying Dubey was involved in a road accident and overturned. The real cause of the accident remains a mystery to this day. Dubey allegedly snatched a pistol from a policeman trying to fix a flat tire and tried to run away, before being killed by the Uttar Pradesh police.

Post-death investigation
Following Dubey's death, an investigation led by retired Supreme Court judge B. S. Chauhan was initiated to look into the 2nd July encounter. People in Dubey's circle, Dubey's state connections, and how he managed to get bail was investigated. The judicial commission also included judge Shashi Kant Agarwal and Indian Police Service officer K. L. Gupta. The Justice B S Chauhan inquiry commission found no evidence of wrongdoing by Uttar Pradesh police in the encounter killings of gangster Dubey and his five associates.

Bikroo Kanpur Gangster 
A film has also been produced on gangster Vikas Dubey named Bikroo Kanpur Gangster. The film is written and directed by Neeraj Singh and Shraddha Srivastava. During a press conference, the film's director Neeraj Singh had said that he had to shoot the film in Kanpur but later he was disallowed to shoot it further. Neeraj Singh had also stated at the press conference that he had received many threatening calls.

References

1964 births
2020 deaths
Criminals from Uttar Pradesh
People from Kanpur
People shot dead by law enforcement officers in India
Indian gangsters killed in encounters